Simsia is a genus of flowering plants in the tribe Heliantheae within the family Asteraceae.  It includes annuals, herbaceous perennials, and shrubs. They range from the western United States south through Central and South America to Argentina, with the center of diversity occurring in Mexico. The genus is named for British physician and botanist John Sims (1749–1831). Although some species are relatively rare, others have become common weeds that line the roadsides and fields of Mexico, often forming dense stands mixed with Tithonia and other Asteraceae. Some species are known by the common name bushsunflower.

Description and systematics
A feature that characterizes many of the species of the genus and helps to distinguish them from related genera is the extremely flattened cypsela (achene).  There are, however, several species in which the cypsela is biconvex, and these are recognized as belonging to Simsia by a group of other, mostly technical features, including nodal disks (stipule-like appendages at the base of the petioles), relatively long and narrow ray ovaries, and long and tapering style branches that lack a pronounced apical appendage.

The genus was thoroughly studied by Spooner using comparative morphology, chromosome counts, and crossing experiments, and based on samples from wide-ranging field work.  Subsequently two new species have been documented, and additional species are being transferred into the genus.  Although at one time, Simsia was considered to be related to other genera with flattened cypselae, such as Encelia, it is now firmly established that Simsia is part of subtribe Helianthinae (the taxonomic group which includes the common sunflower, Helianthus annuus), and is a close relative of Tithonia

All of the species for which chromosome counts have been made are diploid (x = 17), and crossing experiments suggest that there are few barriers to hybridization between species of the genus.  Natural hybridization appears to occur and may complicate identification of some specimens, particularly involving the weedy species such as S. foetida, S. amplexicaulis, and S. lagascaeformis.

 Species
 Simsia amplexicaulis (Cav.) Pers. - Guatemala, Honduras, Mexico (from Chihuahua to Chiapas)
 Simsia annectens S.F.Blake - Chiapas, Michoacán, Oaxaca, Guerrero, México State, Jalisco, Nayarit
 Simsia calva (A.Gray) A.Gray – Awnless bush sunflower - Nuevo León, Coahuila, Hidalgo, Tamaulipas, United States (TX NM)
 Simsia caucana Cuatrec. - Cauca in Colombia
 Simsia chaseae (Millspaugh) S.F.Blake - Veracruz, Yucatán Peninsula
 Simsia dombeyana (A.Gray) S.F.Blake - Venezuela, Ecuador, Peru, Brazil, Bolivia, Paraguay, Argentina
 Simsia eurylepis S.F.Blake - San Luis Potosí, Tamaulipas, Veracruz, Campeche, Nuevo León
 Simsia foetida (Cav.) S.F.Blake - from Michoacán to Nicaragua
 Simsia fruticulosa (Sprengel) S.F.Blake - Colombia, Venezuela, Ecuador
 Simsia ghiesbreghtii (A.Gray) S.F.Blake - Chiapas, Guatemala
 Simsia grandiflora Benth. ex Oerst. - Nicaragua, Honduras, El Salvador, Guatemala, Chiapas
 Simsia guatemalensis H.Rob. & Brettell - Honduras, El Salvador, Guatemala
 Simsia hispida (Kunth) Cass. - San Luis Potosí, Michoacán, México State
 Simsia holwayi S.F.Blake - Guatemala, Chiapas
 Simsia jamaicensis S.F.Blake - Jamaica
 Simsia lagasceiformis DC. – Annual bush sunflower - Mexico, Guatemala, United States (AZ TX NM)
 Simsia molinae H.Rob. & Brettell - Honduras, Nicaragua
 Simsia pastoensis Triana - Colombia
 Simsia sanguinea A.Gray - El Salvador, Guatemala, Chiapas, Oaxaca, Puebla, Veracruz, Michoacán, Morelos, México State, Jalisco
 Simsia santarosensis Spooner - Costa Rica
 Simsia setosa S.F.Blake - Sonora, Durango, Nayarit
 Simsia steyermarkii H.Rob. & Brettell - Guatemala
 Simsia subaristata A.Gray - Nuevo León 
 Simsia tenuis (Fernald) S.F.Blake - Guerrero
 Simsia villasenorii Spooner - Chiapas, Oaxaca

 Formerly included
numerous species now regarded as members of other genera: Encelia Geraea Iostephane Viguiera

References

Asteraceae genera
Heliantheae